Aconcagua Provincial Park is a Provincial Park located in the Mendoza Province in Argentina. 
The Andes mountain range draws all types of thrill seekers ranging in difficulty including hiking, climbing, skiing, etc. Besides it draws history lovers.

This range plays an important place in the history of Latin America. In 1818 General Don Jose de San Martin crossed these mountains during war with the Spanish Empire eventually securing independence for Chile by his daring raid. The summit of the mountain Aconcagua, the tallest mount in the Andes range, was considered unattainable for many years until January 14, 1897, when Matthias Zurbriggen, a member of the FitzGerald expedition, finally reached it. Since then many climbers made the same ascent to the top. Needless to say it is a dangerous endeavor that requires stamina and experience.

Some of the more visited attractions that draw tourists all year long besides Mount Aconcagua are Horcones Lagoon and Plaza de Mulas or Plaza Francia.

Climbing areas of Argentina
Parks in Argentina
Protected areas of Mendoza Province
Provincial Parks in Argentina